The Police Ground is a multi-use stadium located in St. George Parish on Antigua island, in the country of Antigua and Barbuda.  

It is currently used mostly for football (soccer) matches.  

The stadium holds 2,000 people.

See also

References

Football venues in Antigua and Barbuda
Saint George Parish, Antigua and Barbuda